Abbasabad (also Romanized as ‘Abbāsābād and Abasabad) is a village in Azimiyeh Rural District, in the Central District of Ray County, Tehran Province, Iran. At the 2006 census, its population was 5,683, in 1,373 families.

References 

Populated places in Ray County, Iran